59 (fifty-nine) is the natural number following 58 and preceding 60.

In mathematics
Fifty-nine is the 17th prime number. The next is sixty-one, with which it comprises a twin prime. 59 is an irregular prime, a safe prime and the 14th supersingular prime. It is an Eisenstein prime with no imaginary part and real part of the form . Since  is divisible by 59 but 59 is not one more than a multiple of 15, 59 is a Pillai prime.

It is also a highly cototient number.

There are 59 stellations of the regular icosahedron, inclusive of the icosahedron.

59 is one of the factors that divides the smallest composite Euclid number. In this case 59 divides the Euclid number 13# + 1 = 2 × 3 × 5 × 7 × 11 × 13 + 1 = 59 × 509 = 30031.

59 is the highest integer a single symbol may represent in the Sexagesimal system.

As 17 is prime, 59 is a super-prime.

The number 59 takes 3 iterations of the "reverse and add" process to form the palindrome 1111. All smaller integers (1 through 58) take either one or two iterations to form a palindrome through this process.

In science
The atomic number of praseodymium, a lanthanide.

Astronomy

Messier object M59, a magnitude 11.5 galaxy in the constellation Virgo.
The New General Catalogue object NGC 59, a magnitude 12.4 spiral galaxy in the constellation Cetus.

In music

 Beethoven's Opus 59 consists of the three so-called Razumovsky Quartets
 59, an album by Puffy AmiYumi
 The 1960s song "The 59th Street Bridge Song (Feelin' Groovy)" was popularized by Simon & Garfunkel and Harpers Bizarre
 The '59 Sound, an album by The Gaslight Anthem; includes the song of the same name
 The album 14:59 by Sugar Ray
 "11:59", a song by Blondie from Parallel Lines
 '59 is the sixth track on the album Ignition! by Brian Setzer
 59 is an area code of Andheri, Mumbai. Used by Vivian Divine in various songs with Gully Gang.

In sports
 Satchel Paige became the oldest Major League Baseball player at age 59.
 59 is the lowest golf score in a single round on the LPGA Tour by Annika Sörenstam, and on the Champions Tour by Kevin Sutherland.

In other fields

Fifty-nine is:
 The number corresponding to the last minute in a given hour, and the last second in a given minute
 The number of beads on a Roman Catholic rosary (Dominican).
 Approximately the number of days in two lunar months
 The Queensboro Bridge in New York City is also known as the 59th Street Bridge
 The number on a button commonly worn by feminist activists in the 1970s; this was based on the claim that a woman earned 59 cents to an equally qualified man's dollar
 Art Project 59's "59 Seconds Video Festival" at 59 Franklin Street, showed 59 videos to 59 different audiences, each 59 seconds long and incorporating the number 59
 In amateur radio, a perfect signal report
 Five Nine, an amateur radio magazine published in Japan
 The number of the French department Nord
 The "59-minute rule" is an informal rule in business, whereby (usually near a holiday) employees may be allowed to leave work early, often to beat heavy holiday traffic (the 59 minutes coming from the rule that leaving one full hour early requires the use of leave, whereas leaving 59 minutes early would not)
 59th Street Food Company - a store brand offering mainly convenience foods.  It is owned by Parkland Corporation and is sold at their convenience stores/fuel stations.

References

Integers